Veselina Gencheva (born 26 May 1981) is a Bulgarian gymnast. She competed at the 1996 Summer Olympics.

References

External links
 

1981 births
Living people
Bulgarian female artistic gymnasts
Olympic gymnasts of Bulgaria
Gymnasts at the 1996 Summer Olympics
Gymnasts from Sofia